Carache is one of the 20 municipalities of the state of Trujillo, Venezuela. The municipality occupies an area of 957 km² with a population of 32,820 inhabitants according to the 2011 census.

Towns and parishes
The municipality is divided into the following parishes, each of which contain smaller towns.
 Carache: 11,592 (40% of pop.)
 La Concepción: 5,583 (19%)
 Cuicas: 5,825 (20%)
 Panamericana: 1,926 (7%)
 Santa Cruz: 4,125 (14%)

Carache 

 Agua De Obispo
 La Peña
 Las Palmas
 Las Peñitas
 La Laguneta
 La Ranchería
 Loma Pancha
 Las Adjuntas
 Vega Arriba
 Miquimbay
 El Cortijo
 El Potrero
 Mesa Arriba
 Cahingó
 Mesa Abajo
 Mirinday
 San Antonio
 Las Montañitas
 Loma Del Medio
 Loma De San Juan
 Loma De Bonilla
 Picachitos
 La Unión
 La Morita
 Río Abajo
 La Platera
 La Playa
 Los Patiecitos
 Los Cardones
 Cerro Mupi
 Cerro La Cruz
 Barrio El Sartén
 Tejerías
 Brisas De San Juan
 Cuatro Vientos
 Palo Negro
 La Calera
 Cerro San Juan
 Centro De Carache
 Las Mesitas
 Santa Eduvigis
 Urbanización El Rosario
 El Bucarito
 Bojoto después de la quebrada

La Concepción 

 Portachuelo
 Río Arriba
 Sisi
 Cendé
 Polipodio
 Biticuy
 El Potrero
 El Potrerito
 La Alcabala
 El Molino
 Los Guajes
 El Chepe
 Miquimu
 Bogoto
 Mesa Postrera
 La Becerrera
 Miquia Arriba
 Miquia Abajo
 Quebrada Arriba
 Quebrada Seca
 Quebrada De Agua
 Centro De La Concepción
 Betichope
 Sánchez Cortez
 Las Mesitas
 Los Totumos
 El Pupitre

Cuicas 

 Cerro Largo
 Cerro Libre
 La Placita
 Arenales
 El Filo
 San Juan
 El Castillo
 Palmas Reales
 El Helechal
 Casa De Zinc
 Cerro Gordo
 El Paramito Frío
 Ventilación
 El Cumbe
 Japaz
 Cuicas
 Cerro Gordo
 Centro De Cuicas
 Barrio Nuevo
 La Pirela
 La Guajira
 El Tesoro
 La Invasión
 Barrio La Providencia
 El Calvario
 Campo Lindo
 El Vigía
 Barrio Moscú
 Las minas
 Palmira
 Frutas coloradas
 Los Chaos la Rivera

Santa Cruz 

 La Cuchilla
 Santo Domingo
 El Fundo
 Mongon
 Madre Vieja
 El Trentino
 Puente Villegas
 Valle Hondo
 El Santero
 La Acequia

Panamericana 

 San Felipe
 Santa Rosa
 El Paramito Caliente
 La Rivera
 El Cerrito
 Zapatero
 San Miguel
 Caño Arriba

References

Municipalities of Trujillo (state)